Vivekananda Kendra Vidyalaya Dibrugarh, also known as VKV Dibrugarh, is a school in Dibrugarh, in the state of Assam, India.

History 
Vivekananda Kendra Vidyalaya is a coed English medium school, established under the auspices of the Vivekananda Kendra, Kanyakumari – a spiritually oriented service mission. It was constructed on New Khalihamari Road just  from Brahmaputra with the help of Mr. K. K. Narayanan, the mentor of Vivekananda Kendra Vidyalaya, and local citizens. With nine students and two teaching staff members, and K. K. Narayanan as the founder Principal with two rented rooms; the school had its humble beginning in the year 1981 at Khaliamari, Dibrugarh. Later, when the construction of the school building commenced, the school was moved from its current premises to an abandoned garage complex at Boiragimoth on Convoy Road, Dibrugarh. The school continued to function from its Khalihamari location until the end of 1984, after which it permanently moved to its present location on Vivekananda Path, East Chowkidinghee, Dibrugarh in the year 1985. Since then, the school has gradually expanded to accommodate an increasing number of students year-on-year, besides catering to the burgeoning interests of its members in school activities .

Location 
Vivekananda Kendra Vidyalaya, Vivekananda Path, East Chowkidinghee, Dibrugarh, Assam

About 
The school is affiliated to the Central Board of Secondary Education (CBSE), New Delhi. The school was upgraded to the senior secondary level in 2001.
The educational system is administrated by Vivekananda Kendra Shiksha Prasar Vibhag – the educational wing of Vivekananda Kendra, Kanyakumari, a spiritually oriented service organization inspired by the philosophy – Man Making – Nation Building Education of Swami Vivekananda. The Vidyalaya endeavors to achieve academic excellence, besides imparting patriotism, and encouraging local culture.

The subject combinations for the session beginning in June and ending in March are:

Senior Secondary Course (Science):
Compulsory: Physics, Chemistry, Maths, English.
Optional: Computer Science, Biology
Senior Secondary Course (Commerce):
Compulsory: Accountancy, Business Studies, English, Economics.
Optional: Computer Science, Mathematics, Informatics Practices
The first batch of Secondary students (Class X) passed in the year 1993, and the first batch of Senior Secondary Students (Class XII) passed in 2003. The institute has classes from Pre-nursery to Class XII and has separate Computer, Physics, Chemistry, Biology laboratories for higher studies.

In addition to the laboratories, the  school has classes for physical training, yoga and music. It also has a well coordinating band group including students of classes 8 and 9. The school has various other soft skill classes for different subjects like martial arts, various musical instruments, art and craft etc. With a total of 1045 students, the school celebrates different occasions by organizing various cultural functions for its students

External links
 New website
 Old website
 Vivekananda Kendra website
 Vivekananda Kendra website
 Vivekananda Kendra Vidyalayas Arunachal Pradesh Trust
 Vivekananda Kendra Vidyalaya

Private schools in Assam
Vivekananda Kendra schools
Educational institutions established in 1981
1981 establishments in Assam